Up4Sale.com was an online auction website, which launched on July 1, 1997 and was based in Cincinnati, Ohio, United States. Its co-founders included Rob Ratterman, Chris Downie, Tom Duvall, and Wally Carroll. It was the only pre-IPO acquisition made by eBay on July 16, 1998, and subsequently integrated into the company. Up4Sale.com shut down in 2000.

References

Further reading
 "Local team makes millions with Web site". The Cincinnati Enquirer. Retrieved August 10, 2010.
 "Online auction bought by eBay is going local". The Cincinnati Post. March 23, 1999.
 "four rode 'net to riches". The Cincinnati Post. March 18, 1999.
 "Top toys auctioned on Internet". The Cincinnati Post. December 13, 1997.
 
 
 
 
 
 "SparkPeople" "Founded by Chris Downie."
 "Chris Downie" Freebase
 "CanDo" website

Defunct software companies of the United States
EBay
1998 mergers and acquisitions